Ramon Vega (born 14 June 1971) is a Swiss retired footballer, who played as a central defender.

During his 13-year professional career he played for Grasshoppers, Cagliari, Tottenham Hotspur, Celtic, Watford and Créteil. Vega also played 23 times for Switzerland, appearing in the UEFA Euro 1996 tournament.

Early life
Vega was one of five children to Spanish immigrants. He was born in Olten near Zürich, with the remaining siblings already born in his parents' native city of Madrid.

Vega attended school in Trimbach and went on to study for a degree in banking and financing, at the Zürich Business School.

Club career
Vega began his professional career in with local Grasshopper Club Zürich in 1989, being a defensive mainstay from his second season onwards. He was essential in two of the three leagues he actually conquered, playing in 67 games combined and scoring seven goals.

In the 1996 summer Vega moved to Italy with Cagliari Calcio, in the Serie A. However, after only seven months, he signed with England's Tottenham Hotspur, for a transfer fee of £3.75 million. He was used mostly as a backup with his new side, helping it win the Football League Cup in 1999; in the final, a 1–0 win over Leicester City, he broke his ankle, and could never regain his previous form with Spurs.

In mid-December 2000, Vega moved on loan to Celtic – in the previous off-season, he rejected a move to the club– where he played a significant part in the winning of three trophies, in a short six-month spell. In his debut, on the 17th, he netted twice in the home demolition of Aberdeen (6–0); he also scored a brace against Dunfermline in the Scottish Cup.

Released by Tottenham in June 2001, after also having refused the Scottish club's offer of an additional year, Vega moved back to England with Watford, penning a three-year deal with the Championship outfit. One of the side's best-paid players under manager Gianluca Vialli, he was released after just one season, as the club underachieved for a final 14th position; for the Hornets he netted three times, once in the league against Norwich City and twice in the League Cup, against Bristol City and Bradford City.

Vega retired in 2004 aged 33, after one season with lowly US Créteil-Lusitanos in France.

International career
Vega first played for Switzerland in 1993, but was overlooked for the 1994 FIFA World Cup in the United States.

Two years later, he was picked – and started – for the squad at UEFA Euro 1996 in England, helping them to a 1–1 draw against the hosts. His career brought him a total of 23 caps, and he also captained the side on occasion, scoring in the 1–1 friendly match with England – who were preparing for the 1998 World Cup – in Bern.

Personal life
After his retirement, in 2012 he became a founding member of the Duet Group, a financial group specializing in asset management and private equity. In 2006 Vega also founded the Matterhorn Capital Rosalp, a Swiss real estate company focusing on the development of luxury hotels worldwide, opening the first facilities in Verbier, Switzerland. He also opened "Ramon Vega's Soccer School" in Marbella, Spain.

Vega owned a stake in a Romford jewellery shop, Ministry of Gold.

In February 2009, Vega unsuccessfully bid to purchase Premier League team and FA Cup holders Portsmouth from its owner Alexandre Gaydamak; however, he was consistently not able to demonstrate an ability to secure financing for his proposal.

In October 2015 he announced that he was considering standing as a candidate in the FIFA presidential election.

Honours
Grasshoppers
Swiss Super League: 1990–91, 1994–95, 1995–96
Swiss Cup: 1993–94

Tottenham
Football League Cup: 1998–99

Celtic
Scottish Premier League: 2000–01
Scottish Cup: 2000–01
Scottish League Cup: 2000–01

Career statistics

¹ include Coppa Italia, FA Cup, Scottish Cup, and Coupe de France .

² include Football League Cup, Scottish League Cup, and Coupe de la Ligue.

References

External links

 Ramon Vega Interview

1971 births
Living people
People from Olten
Swiss people of Spanish descent
Swiss men's footballers
Association football defenders
Swiss Super League players
Grasshopper Club Zürich players
Serie A players
Cagliari Calcio players
Premier League players
Tottenham Hotspur F.C. players
Scottish Premier League players
Celtic F.C. players
English Football League players
Watford F.C. players
Ligue 2 players
US Créteil-Lusitanos players
Switzerland international footballers
UEFA Euro 1996 players
Swiss expatriate footballers
Expatriate footballers in Italy
Expatriate footballers in England
Expatriate footballers in France
Expatriate footballers in Scotland
Swiss expatriate sportspeople in Italy
Swiss expatriate sportspeople in England
Swiss expatriate sportspeople in Scotland
Sportspeople from the canton of Solothurn